Dylan Alejandro Escobar Álvarez (born 2 December 2000) is a Chilean professional footballer who plays as a defensive midfielder or defender for Chilean Primera División side Coquimbo Unido.

Club career
Born in Huasco, Chile, Escobar came to Coquimbo Unido youth system in 2019 and signed his first professional contract in January 2022.

He made his professional debut in the 2–1 loss against O'Higgins on 1 April 2022, by replacing Víctor González at the minute 93.

Personal life
Escobar is nicknamed Hueso (Bone).

References

External links
 
 
 
 Dylan Escobar at PlaymakerStats

2000 births
Living people
People from Huasco Province
Chilean footballers
Association football midfielders
Association football defenders
Coquimbo Unido footballers
Chilean Primera División players